This Here Is Bobby Timmons is an album by American jazz pianist Bobby Timmons recorded in 1960 and released on the Riverside label. It was his first album as sole leader; the earlier Jenkins, Jordan and Timmons (1957) was a co-led date with saxophonists John Jenkins and Clifford Jordan.

Reception
The AllMusic review awarded the album 4 stars.

Track listing
All compositions by Bobby Timmons except as indicated
 "This Here"3:34 
 "Moanin'"5:08 
 "Lush Life" (Billy Strayhorn)2:31 
 "The Party's Over" (Jule Styne)4:14 
 "Prelude to a Kiss" (Duke Ellington, Irving Mills)3:23 
 "Dat Dere"5:26 
 "My Funny Valentine" (Lorenz Hart, Richard Rodgers)5:08 
 "Come Rain or Come Shine" (Harold Arlen, Johnny Mercer)4:33 
 "Joy Ride"3:58 
Recorded at Reeves Sound Studios in New York City on January 13 & 14, 1960.

Personnel
Bobby Timmonspiano   
Sam Jonesbass (except track 3)
Jimmy Cobbdrums (except track 3)

References

Riverside Records albums
Bobby Timmons albums
1960 albums
Albums produced by Orrin Keepnews